MomoCon is a fan convention held in March or May in Atlanta, Georgia.

From its beginning through 2011, it was held on the campus of the Georgia Institute of Technology; in its first year, MomoCon was held in the Georgia Tech Student Center. In 2006, it expanded to include several events, mostly video game tournaments, in the nearby Instructional Center. In 2011, it was held in Technology Square, and in 2012, it was held in the Atlanta Marriott Marquis.

The convention encompasses anime, video games, LARP, webcomics, comics, costuming, card games, board games, science fiction and prop armor construction, among other things.

From 2005 to 2011, there was no entry fee to MomoCon; the convention sold T-shirts and highlight DVDs to fund the next year. Due to rising costs, 2012 was the first year that an admission fee was required.

History
The word "momo" in Japanese means "peaches", and its host state, Georgia, being the "Peach State" led to the naming of MomoCon.

Every year, MomoCon has a theme that goes into the design of the convention that year. The first year, it was "Southern Hospitality" and T-shirts were black and featured the MomoCon mascot, as created and drawn by H. M. Ogburn. In 2005, MomoCon was run by an estimated 35 volunteers. The convention had over 30 guests and many special demo teams, as well as several special events and feature movies. An article on the anime club and the convention was featured in the February 2005 issue of Newtype USA, and professionally made commercials were seen around Georgia Tech campus before on-campus movies in the Student Center.

In 2006, T-shirts for 2006 were black and featured the same MomoCon mascot in a purple kimono in the moonlight, to coincide with the Tsukimi ("moon-viewing") theme. MomoCon 2006 had a convention motto of "Because You Shouldn't Have to Pay for Quality" and featured an opening ceremonies video that was a parody of Iron Chef, with "Chairman Panda" and the "Iron Staff". Key events for 2006 included a Tsukimi festival with kimono-clad wait staff, a Gaming Decathlon, a Pocky Stop cafe, and a rain-cancelled Sidewalk Art competition. Guests included numerous webcomic and comic artists, voice actress Amy Howard Wilson of Star Blazers fame and prop maker Robert "Vaderpainter" Bean.

In 2007, T-shirts for 2007 were hunter green and featured the MomoCon mascot; the staff theme was "The Family". The video game tournaments were reworked to feature a few large tournaments, as opposed to many smaller tournaments, and a larger costume contest was held at Georgia Tech's Kessler Campanile. The new costume contest location provided seating for a greater number of attendees, and was held earlier in the evening. Local area groups stepped forward to run workshops and seminars on their respective expertise, including a plethora of costuming panels and workshops, Japanese ceremonial demonstrations and game demos. On Sunday (March 18, 2007), the convention was closed nine hours early because several con attendees attempted to set off firecrackers inside the Georgia Tech Student Center.

Because the number 4 is considered unlucky in Japanese culture, MomoCon 2008 (the 4th event) featured a gothic horror-style theme. In addition to several events from past years, 2008's event included a Twilight Tea event, at the end of the day on Sunday, in lieu of a closing ceremony. Con-goers were asked to stop by for some fresh-brewed tea under the light of red paper lanterns at dusk and let the staff know what they would like to see at the event in the future. Due to the security problem in 2007, subsequent MomoCon events (starting with 2008) have required registration to enter. Attendees were required to present a valid photo ID to enter, and children under the age of 16 needed to be accompanied by an adult. Badges were provided, and the event remained free for congoers.

The theme for MomoCon 2009 was retro-campy science fiction. Additional Japanese cultural events were held, including community support from local groups who specialize in these events. The second floor of the Instructional Center building, previously used only for tournaments, was used for additional panel, workshop and anime viewing space. Special events included screenings of public domain science fiction movies from the 1950s and 1960s and a Mechas and Monsters late-night programming block, featuring Kaiju and mecha movies. The first band performance at MomoCon happened in 2009: The Extraordinary Contraptions, a Steampunk-themed rock band.

On April 6, 2020, it was announced that the 2020 MomoCon, which was scheduled for May 21–24, had been cancelled due to the COVID-19 pandemic. The next MomoCon was scheduled for May 27–30, 2021, but on February 27, 2021 it was also cancelled due to COVID-19 and "the uncertainty about the future of the entire events industry also pushing events further into the calendar year". A smaller-scale spin-off event known as "Winterfest by MomoCon" has been scheduled in December 2021,

Event history

Peripheral events/MomoCon on Tour

MomoCon also sponsors local events that bolster awareness of the convention and of Japanese culture. Anime O-Tekku began this tradition by bringing many movies and gatherings to Georgia Tech's campus and Atlanta, and MomoCon continues it.
Georgia Tech Riki-Oh Night 2005 - MomoCon helped staff and financially sponsor the annual Georgia Tech cult film festival and Super Smash Brothers Melee tournament, Riki-Oh Night. The convention paid in part for the banner and prizes for the tournament.
Photoshoots on Tour 2006-2017 - MomoCon on Tour has hosted photoshoots around the southeast since 2006, including two Savannah shoots (one on Tybee Island), three South Carolina shoots, a zombie-themed Halloween shoot in Perry, GA, joint photoshoots with Middle Tennessee Anime Convention and Anime Weekend Atlanta in Chattanooga, TN and Rhodes Hall in Atlanta, respectively.
Gaming Festivals 2009-2010, 2012-2014 MomoCon hosted a Summer and Winter Gaming Festival at the Georgia Tech Student Center. Events included board, card, and RPG gaming, as well as retro video gaming.
Cosplayers on Ice 2007-2016 - Annually in December, MomoCon on Tour welcomes attendees to the Cosplayers on Ice event.  
Steampunk Photoshoot 2008 - On May 24, 2008, MomoCon in association with Peach State Cosplay Society hosted a Steampunk photoshoot on Georgia Tech campus. The shoot took advantage of some of the unique campus architecture and was open to all types of costumers.
MomoCon Winter Ball 2008-2015 - MomoCon hosts a winter semi-formal ball event annually. It features wintery decorations, DJs playing danceable anime/video game tunes as well as classic pop, rock, big band, lounge, and jazz music. 
MomoCon Summer Charity Ball 2008-2010, 2012-2014 - MomoCon hosts a summer semi-formal ball with all proceeds benefiting the Susan G. Komen organization for breast cancer awareness.
Twilight Masquerade 2015, The Crystal Ball 2017 - MomoCon hosted (alongside Dragon Con for The Crystal Ball) a full formal masquerade event in 2015 and 2017 held in the Oceans Ballroom at the Georgia Aquarium.
Winterfest is scheduled to be held in December 2021, as a smaller-scale replacement for the main convention due to the COVID-19 pandemic.

References

External links 

MomoCon LiveJournal Community
MomoCon Official MySpace page
Anime O-Tekku
MomoCon on Tour webpage

Georgia Tech
Culture of Atlanta
Multigenre conventions
Tourist attractions in Atlanta
Conventions in Atlanta